The Norwegian Armed Forces is the military organization responsible for the defence of Norway. It consists of five branches, the Norwegian Army, the Royal Norwegian Navy, which includes the Coast Guard, the Royal Norwegian Air Force, the Home Guard, and Norwegian Cyber Defence Force as well as several joint departments.

The military force in peace time is around 17 185 personnel including military and civilian staff, and around 70 000 in total with the current military personnel, conscripts and the Norwegian Home Guard in full mobilization.

Among European NATO members, the military expenditure of US$7.2 billion is the highest per capita.

History
An organised military was first assembled in Norway in the 9th century and its early focus was naval warfare. The army was created in 1628 as part of Denmark–Norway, followed by two centuries of regular wars. A Norwegian military was established in 1814, but the military did not see combat until the German occupation of Norway in 1940. Norway abandoned its position as a neutral country in 1949 to become a founding member of the North Atlantic Treaty Organization (NATO). The Cold War saw a large build-up of air stations and military bases, especially in Northern Norway. Since the 2000s, the military has transformed from a focus on defence from an invasion to a mobile force for international missions.

Norway had its combat units retreat from the War in Afghanistan in 2021. During the war, Norwegian combat forces had been on loan to ISAF, and later on loan to Resolute Support Mission.

Organisation
The formal commander-in-chief is King Harald V; however, the de facto supreme decision-making is made by the Cabinet, led by the Prime Minister. The Chief of Defence (a four-star general or admiral) is the professional head and leader of the armed forces, and is the principal military adviser to the Minister of Defence. The Chief of Defence and his staff is located at Akershus Fortress in Oslo, while the Norwegian Joint Headquarters, responsible for commanding operations, is located in Bodø. The main naval base is Haakonsvern in Bergen, the main army camps are in Bardu, Målselv and Rena, and the main air station is Ørland.

Military branches (in order of seniority):
Norwegian Army
Royal Norwegian Navy
Royal Norwegian Air Force
Home Guard
Norwegian Cyber Defence Force
Norwegian Special Operation Forces (NORSOF)

Other main structures include:

 Defence Staff Norway (DEFSTNOR) in Oslo acts as the staff of the Chief of Defence. It is headed by a three-star general or admiral. DEFSTNOR assigns priorities, manages resources, provides force generation and support activities. Each of the four branches of defence is headed by a two-star general/admiral who are subordinate to DEFSTNOR.
 Norwegian Joint Headquarters (NJHQ) located at Reitan, close to Bodø has operational control of Norwegian armed forces worldwide 24/7. It is headed by the Supreme Commander Norwegian Forces – a three-star general or admiral.
 Norwegian Defence Logistics Organisation (NDLO) at Kolsås outside Oslo is responsible for engineering, procurement, investment, supply, information and communications technology. It is also responsible for maintenance, repair and storage of material.

Conscription

Conscription was constitutionally established the 12 April 1907 with Kongeriket Norges Grunnlov § 119. 
Norway employs a weak form of mandatory military service for men and women. While 62,873 men and women were called in for the examination of persons liable for military service in 2010 (mandatory for men), 9,631 were conscripted. In practice recruits are not forced to serve, instead only those who are motivated are selected. In earlier times, up until at least the early 2000s, all men aged 19–44 were subject to mandatory service, with good reasons required to avoid becoming drafted.

Since 1985, women have been able to enlist for voluntary service as regular recruits. On 14 June 2013, the Norwegian Parliament voted to extend conscription to women. In 2015 conscription was extended to women making Norway the first NATO member and first European country to make national service compulsory for both men and women. In 2020, women made up one-third of new conscripts.

There is a right of conscientious objection.

Students of professional subjects (doctors, psychologists, pharmacists, dentists, etc.) may serve their conscription after completing a six weeks course, receiving lieutenant ranking when they begin their service. This arrangement is called Conscript Academic Officer (Norwegian: Vernepliktige akademikere (VA)).

In 2020, the media said that "several soldiers said that they were informed about additional four months of service; the information was given after military service had started".

Structure

Joint
 Norwegian Joint Headquarters in Bodø
 Norwegian Intelligence Service
 12 Home Guard districts
 Tactical Mobile Land/Maritime Command
 Joint ISTAR Unit (Intelligence, Surveillance, Target Acquisition and Reconnaissance)
 Module based ISTAR Unit
 Norwegian Coastal Ranger Command (Kystjegerkommandoen in Norwegian)
 Unmanned aerial vehicle capability
 Airborne Ground Surveillance (joint NATO project)
 Norwegian Home Guard – 45,000 personnel, rapid reaction forces, follow-on-forces, reinforcement forces and reserves.
 Capacity for information operations
 Norwegian Defence Security Department (NORDSD)
 Flexible medical units
 NRBC protection (Nuclear, radiological, biological, chemical weapons)
 Explosive Ordnance Disposal
 Joint C2I Unit (command, control and information)
 Civil Military Coordination Unit (CIMIC)
 Deployable logistical support
 2 mobilisation host country battalions (logistics for allied reinforcements)

Norwegian Army
From 1 August 2009 the Norwegian Army changed its structure:

 Brigade Nord (operational units)
 Armoured Battalion (Panserbataljonen, 1.Bn), in Setermoen with Leopard 2A4NO main battle tanks and CV90 infantry fighting vehicles
 2nd Battalion (2. Bataljon), mechanized infantry in Skjold with Bandvagn 206 vehicles
 Telemark Battalion (Telemark Bataljon, 3.Bn), in Rena with Leopard 2A4NO main battle tanks and CV90 infantry fighting vehicles
 Artillery Battalion (Artilleribataljonen), in Setermoen with K9 Thunder self-propelled howitzers 
 Combat Engineer Battalion (Ingeniørbataljonen), in Skjold
 Signals Battalion (Sambandsbataljonen), in Bardufoss
 Medical Battalion (Sanitetsbataljonen), in Setermoen
 Combat Service Support Battalion (Stridstrenbataljonen), in Bardufoss
 Military Police Company (Militærpoliti-kompaniet), in Bardufoss
 Finnmark Territorial Defence (Finnmark Landforsvar)
 Garrison of Sør-Varanger
 Porsanger Battalion
(Finnmark 17th Home Guard District (Finnmark HV-district 17 (HV-17)) permanently attached to the army-lead FTD)
 Army Land Warfare Centre
 His Majesty the King's Guard
 Logistics and Operational Support
 Operation Support Detachment

Royal Norwegian Navy

 4  Aegis frigates
 6  fast missile boats.
 6  submarines
 Mine Warfare Capability
 6 (8) s and s
 Norwegian Coastal Ranger Command
 Tactical Boat Squadron
 Norwegian Naval EOD Command (divers)
 Fleet Logistics Command
 Supply ship Maud 
 Royal yacht Norge  
 Magnus Lagabøte 
 Olav Trygvasson 
 Coast Guard
 1 Svalbard-class vessel
 3 Barentshav class vessels
 3 
 Leased vessels ( and KV Ålesund, 6 ocean patrol vessels)
 Inner coast guard (25 leased vessels)
 Tug capacity

Royal Norwegian Air Force
 37 Lockheed Martin F-35 Lightning II (52 ordered) 
 2 Air Control Centre/Recognized Air picture Production Centre/Sensor Fusion post (ARS Sørreisa and ARS Mågerø)
 Strategic Airlift / Aerial refueling (common NATO projects)
 Maritime surveillance (4 x P-3C Orion and 2 x P-3N Orion). (Being replaced by five P-8A Poseidon, to be delivered between 2022 and 2023.)
 Transport 4x C-130J Super Hercules
 Air Defence (NASAMS 3)
 Air Wing for Special Forces (6 x Bell 412)
 18 Bell 412 transport helicopters
 Deployable base support
 12 Sea King search and rescue helicopters. (Being replaced by 16 AW101)

Norwegian Home Guard
 Home Guard

Norwegian Cyber Defence Force
 Norwegian Cyber Defence Force

Special forces
The Norwegian Special Operations Command (NORSOCOM) (Forsvarets Spesialstyrker (FS), was formed on 1 January 2014 by bringing the Special Operations Commando - (Forsvarets Spesialkommando (FSK), the army special warfare unit) and the Naval Special Operations Commando (Marinejegerkommandoen (MJK), the naval special warfare unit) together under a unified command.NORSOCOM (Forsvarets Spesjalstyrker (FS)), Akershus Fortress, Oslo

 Chief of NORSOCOM (Sjef FS), a two-star officer, member of the Commander of the Armed Forces's management group (ledergruppen)
 Taktisk Kommando (TAKOM) - special forces-specific command element embedded with the Norwegian Joint Headquarters (Forsvarets operative hovedkvarter (FOH)) outside Bodø.
 Special Operations Commando (FSK), at Rena Army Camp (Rena leir), part of Østerdal Garrison (Østerdal garnison)
 FSK Staff (FSK stab)
 unknown number of combat squadrons (kampskvadroner)
 Paratrooper platoon (Fallskjermjegertroppen), platoon consisting of conscripts highly trained for raid and airborne ISTAR operations.
 Hunter [or Ranger] Troop (Jegertroppen), special reconnaissance training unit, made up of female conscripts (vernepliktige kvinnelige soldater)
 Initial and Operational Special Forces Training Base (Trenings- og beredskapsbase) on the tiny islet of Vealøs facing the former Karljohansvern Naval Base in Horten
Naval Special Operations Commando (MJK), at Jaeger's Bight (Jegerbukten) in Haakonsvern Naval Base (Haakonsvern orlogsstasjon), near Bergen. A research paper of the Norwegian Defence Research Establishment puts the force structure of the MJK at a staff and six combat squadrons (seks skvadroner og en stab):
MJK Staff (MJK stab)
Alfa Squadron (Alfa skvadronen) - combat divers squadron, Norway's premier naval special warfare unit
Bravo Squadron (Bravo skvadronen) - combat divers squadron, entry unit for recent graduates of the frogmen training course
Reconnaissance Squadron (Etterretningsskvadronen) - special reconnaissance and intelligence unit
Echo Squadron (Echo skvadronen) - special boat squadron (Spesialbåtskvadron)
Lima Squadron (Lima skvadronen) - combat service support squadron (Støtteskvadronen)
Training Squadron (Utdanningsskvadronen), at Ramsund Naval War Station (Ramsund orlogsstasjon) near Tjeldsund
339 Special Operations Aviation Squadron, at Rygge Air Station, flying Bell 412SP helicopters, providing air support to the special forces and the Norwegian SWAT unit. Being an air force unit, chief NORSOCOM executes tactical command of 339 SOAS.
Special Operations Air Task Group (SOATG), at Rygge Air Station, providing operational planning, command and control for Norwegian Air Force assets deployed in support of special operations.

 Norwegian Defence University College 
The Norwegian Defence University College (NDUC) (Norwegian (bokmål): Forsvarets høgskole) is the institution in charge of officer and NCO training, re-qualification and military studies. The officer schools of the separate armed services are departments under NDUC and thus independent from their respective services. The central administration of the NDUC is located at the historic Akershus Fortress in the city center of Oslo.

 Leadership Chief of the NDUCThe NDUC is headed by the Chief of the NDUC (sjef FHS, also referred to as rektor), a two-star rank.Leading GroupThe Chief of the NDUC is assisted by the Leading Group (or the Leader's Group, Ledergruppen), composed of the NDUC's Chief of Staff (stabssjef), the officer in charge of academic work (dekan), the chiefs of the Military Academy (Krigsskolen, the army officer school), the Air Force Academy (Luftkrigsskolen, the air force officer school) and the Naval Academy (Sjøkrigsskolen, the naval officer school), the Chief of the Cyber Engineer Academy (Cyberingeniørskolen, the recently established Cyber Defence branch's officer school), the Chief of the NCO School (Befalsskolen, joint for the armed forces), the directors of the two institutes for military studies and the NDUC's Command Sergeant Major (sjefssersjant).Managing BoardThe Managing Board of the NDUC (Høgskolestyret) is the governing body and it includes the Chief of the NDUC, The chiefs of the Army (Hæren), Navy (Sjøforsvaret) and the Air Force (Luftforsvaret), three members of the board (tre ansattrepresentanter), one external (audit) member of the board (ekstern representant) and one student (cadet or civilian) member of the board (studentrepresentant).NDUC HS AdministrationThe NDUC Administration is composed of two staffs (administrative staff (Driftsstab) and academic work staff (Fagstab).

 Departments 
The following departments form the AFHS:Norwegian National Defence Staff CollegeThe Norwegian National Defence Staff College (FHS Stabsskolen) is located in the Akershus Fortress and provides education in general military studies, common to the services, such as strategic military leadership, international peacekeeping operations, Military-Civilian Cooperation etc. It offers Bachelor and Masters programs as well as advanced academic programs.Defence Intelligence CollegeThe Defence Intelligence College (Språk- og etterretningsskolen) is located at the Lutvann Barracks (Lutvann leir) in Oslo and the intelligence officer course is a three-year Bachelor program.Norwegian Military AcademyThe Norwegian Military Academy (Krigsskolen) is the Norwegian army officer school, located at the Linderud Barracks (Linderud leir) in Oslo. It provides officer training and professional development, as well as a NCO training program for high school students (videregående befalsutdanning).Air Force AcademyThe Air Force Academy (Luftkrigsskolen) is the Norwegian air force officer school, located in the Kuhaugen area of Trondheim. It provides officer training and professional development, as well as a NCO training program for high school students (videregående befalsutdanning).Naval AcademyThe Naval Academy (Sjøkrigsskolen) is the Norwegian navy officer school, located in the Laksevåg area of Bergen. It provides officer training and professional development, as well as a NCO training program for high school students (videregående befalsutdanning).Cyber Engineer AcademyThe Cyber Engineer Academy (Cyberingeniørskolen) is the Norwegian Cyber Defence Force officer school, located at the Jørstadmoen Barracks (Jørstadmoen leir) in Fåberg near Lillehammer. It provides training for officer training in communication and information system operations.NCO SchoolThe NCO School (Befalsskolen) is a joint institution, training sergeants for all the services. It is located at the Sessvollmoen Barracks (Sessvollmoen leir) in Sessvollmoen near Oslo - Gardermoen IAP. The school was established in 2019 by merging the NCO school of the army (Hærens befalsskole), navy (Befalsskolen for Sjøforsvaret), air force (Luftforsvarets flygeskole), engineering services (Forsvarets ingeniørhøgskole), military intelligence service (Forsvarets etterretningshøgskole) and the Home Guard (Heimevernets befalsskole).

 Centers Institute for Defence StudiesThe Institute for Defence Studies (Institutt for forsvarsstudier) is located at the Akershus Fortress. It is organised in four centres: Centre for Norwegian and European Security, Centre for Civil-Military Relations, Centre for Asian Studies and Centre for Transatlantic StudiesArmed Forces Higher School Strategic Course'''

The Strategic Course (FSH / Sjefskurs'') trains senior military officers and high-ranking government officials in strategic military command and national security studies. It uses the education resources of the Institute for Defence Studies, but it is independent from it, directly subordinated to the Chief of the AFHS.

Small arms and handguns
 Heckler & Koch MP5 – replaced by the MP7 in most positions, used by parts of the Home Guard
 Heckler & Koch MP7 - standard issue SMG
 Heckler & Koch HK416 – standard assault rifle
 Heckler & Koch HK417 - designated marksman rifle
 Colt Canada C8SFW – special forces only
 AG3 – former standard assault rifle; currently used by parts of the Home Guard. No longer in service
 Barrett M82
 Barrett MRAD
 Glock 17 – standard issue pistol, replaced by the MP7 in some positions
 Heckler & Koch USP – in use with special forces
 Rheinmetall MG3 – partly replaced by FN Minimi and FN MAG as crew weapon
 FN Minimi
 M2 Browning – known as 12,7 MITR
 M72 LAW – light anti-armour weapon
 Carl Gustav recoilless rifle – anti-armour weapon
 FGM-148 Javelin – anti-armour guided missile
 M320 Grenade Launcher Module

References

Bibliography

External links